Molain is a commune in the Jura department in Bourgogne-Franche-Comté in eastern France.

Population

See also 
 Communes of the Jura department

References 

Communes of Jura (department)